The 1995 Drake Bulldogs football team represented Drake University as a member of the Pioneer Football League (PFL) during the 1995 NCAA Division I-AA football season. Led by third-year head coach Rob Ash, the Bulldogs compiled an overall record of 8–1–1 with a mark of 5–0 in conference play, winning the PFL title. The team played its home games at Drake Stadium in Des Moines, Iowa.

Schedule

References

Drake
Drake Bulldogs football seasons
Pioneer Football League champion seasons
Drake Bulldogs football